Banff and Macduff refers to Banff, Aberdeenshire and Macduff, Aberdeenshire